Ragnar Julius Numelin (28 September 1890 Turku – 12 October 1972 Helsinki) was a Finnish diplomat and a non-fiction writer.

Personal life 
Numelin's parents were the Senator Gustaf Julius Ferdinand Nummelin and Anna Emelie Sourander. He graduated in 1911 as secondary school graduate and graduated as a Bachelor of Philosophy in 1913 and Licentiate in 1919.

Career 
Numelin was  assistant in the University of Helsinki Library from 1914 to 1918 and served in the Foreign Ministry for 35 years from 1918 and served as Consul General in Gothenburg 1945–1947, as Envoy in Brussels from 1947 to 1950 and in Vienna and in Prague in 1950–1953. Numelin published studies in the areas of diplomacy, sociology, ethnology, geography and graphology.

References 

Finnish diplomats
1890 births
1972 deaths
People from Turku